Aurélie Muller (born 7 June 1990) is a French swimmer, who specializes in long-distance freestyle events and open water marathon. She won the 10-kilometer competition at the 2015 world championship in Kazan, Russia and at the 2017 world championship in Budapest, Hungary.

Junior career
In 2006, Muller claimed two freestyle titles (400 and 1500 m) under a junior division at the European Championships in Palma de Mallorca, Spain, and at the FINA World Championships in Rio de Janeiro, Brazil, with respective times of 4:15.72 and 16:35.32.

Senior career
Muller qualified for the 2008 Summer Olympics in Beijing, after placing ninth from the FINA World Open Water Swimming Championships in Seville, Spain. Muller swam in the first ever women's 10 km open water marathon, against a field of 24 other competitors. Muller finished the race in twenty-first place with a total time of 2:02:04.1, approximately two minutes behind winner Larisa Ilchenko of Russia.

At the 2011 FINA World Championships in Shanghai, China, Muller edged out U.S. swimmer Ashley Twichell to clinch a silver medal by a single tenth margin (0.1) in the women's 5 km marathon with a time of 1:00:40.1.

Muller also sought to qualify for the 2012 Summer Olympics in London, but missed an A-standard cut (8:33.84) in the 800 m freestyle from the national trials in Dunkirk by nearly twelve seconds, clocking at 8:45.55.

In 2015, after a switch from Sarreguemines to the Narbonne Swim Club, she becomes world champion in the 10-kilometer competition, the only olympic event, in Kazan and qualifies for the Rio 2016 Olympics.

Muller was voted 2015 European Open water swimmer of the year by European swimming federation LEN.

In the Rio 2016 Olympic 10 km race she finished in second place, but was disqualified for grappling and obstructing Italian Rachele Bruni on the finish line.

References

External links

NBC Olympics Profile

1990 births
Living people
People from Sarreguemines
French female freestyle swimmers
Olympic swimmers of France
Swimmers at the 2008 Summer Olympics
Swimmers at the 2016 Summer Olympics
Female long-distance swimmers
World Aquatics Championships medalists in open water swimming
Sportspeople from Moselle (department)